Elena Vladimirovna Mayorova (30 May 1958 – 23 August 1997) was a Soviet and Russian film and stage actress, Honored Artist of the RSFSR (1989).

Biography 
Her father worked in the depot, and her mother in a factory.

At school, Elena worked with the third class in the Pioneers Palace Theatre Studio. After graduation, Elena Mayorova tried to get into a theater class at a few universities, but was not accepted. One year she had to study in vocational school building, she graduated with honors and received specialty. In 1976, Elena Mayorova entered Russian Academy of Theatre Arts, the course of Oleg Tabakov.

In 1982-1983, after graduating from GITIS, she played in the Sovremennik Theatre. Since 1983 Elena Mayorova actress Moscow Art Theater of the USSR. Gorky, and after its separation in 1987   Moscow Art Theatre  Anton Chekhov. She had her first role in Could One Imagine? directed by Ilya Frez.

Elena Mayorova died under tragic circumstances; the official version is of an accident, although some say suicidal. Accidentally or intentionally, she set fire to her dress while on a staircase in the entrance of the house. With burns 85% of body surface actress was admitted to the Institute Sklifosovsky, where she died. She was buried at the cemetery Troyekurovskoye Cemetery.

Personal life 
 First husband  a fellow student of GITIS Vladimir Chaplygin.
 Second husband the painter-hyperrealist Sergey Sherstuk (1951-1998), survived his wife for exactly 9 months, died of cancer on May 23, 1998.
No children.

Filmography
 1980 —  An Uninvited Friend
 1981 —  Could One Imagine?
 1981 —  Express on Fire
 1981 —  Our Vocation
 1982 —  Whose You, Old Man?
 1983 —  Offered for Singles 
 1983 —  The Last Argument of Kings
 1984 —  Parade of Planets
 1984 —  Alone and Unarmed
 1986 —  I Counselor Outpost
 1987 —  Forgotten Melody for a Flute
 1987 —  Lucky
 1988 —  Two and One
 1988 —  Fast Train (Prize for Best Actress at the "Constellation" (Sozvezdie)  Film Festival)
 1989 —  Was there Carotene?
 1991 —  Lost in Siberia
 1993 —  Makarov
 1993 —  Cloak Casanova
 1995 —  Little Demon
 1996 —  The Return of Battleship
 1996 —  Career of Arturo Ui. A New Version.
 1998 —  At Loggerheads
 1998 —  Chekhov and Co
 1999 —  Listen, If Rain Does Not Go ...

References

External links
 
 Site memory Elena  Mayorova
 Sergey Markov Освобождение Елены Майоровой, «Коллекция Караван историй» No. 5 (35) 2011

1958 births
1997 deaths
People from Yuzhno-Sakhalinsk
Soviet film actresses
Russian film actresses
Russian Academy of Theatre Arts alumni
Deaths from fire
Burials in Troyekurovskoye Cemetery
20th-century Russian actresses
Honored Artists of the RSFSR